The 2015 Judo Grand Prix Tashkent was held at the Sport Hall in Tashkent, Uzbekistan from 1 to 3 October 2015.

Medal summary

Men's events

Women's events

Source Results

Medal table

References

External links
 

2015 IJF World Tour
2015 Judo Grand Prix
Judo
Grand Prix 2015
Judo